Koriyahi previously known as Kalyanpatti is an Indian village located in the Mithila region of Bihar. This village is about 38 kilometres away from its district Sitamarhi and approximately 30 kilometers away from Janakpur, Nepal. It is about 5 kilometres away from Bhitthamore.

Geography 
The village has tolas named Gachi tola, Dacchinwari tola (North), Uttarwari tola (South), Purwari tola (East), tirpit nagar, Kumhar toli, etc.

Transportation

Festivals 
Durga Pooja and Kali Pooja are the village's primary festivals. The other major festival of this area is Chhath Puja in which people offer prayers to the Sun. Holi, Diwali, Dussehra, Makar Sankranti, Eid al-Fitr and Christmas are celebrated.

Trade & Economy 
The main source of trading for villagers is from Yaddupatti bazar market which was previously known as Koriyahi bazaar.

Landmarks 
Durga Mata mandir
Dayal baba 
Munsiad baba

References 

Villages in Sitamarhi district